Prepuštovec is a village part of the City of Zagreb, Croatia. It is connected by the D29 highway. Its population in 2011 was 332.

References

Populated places in the City of Zagreb